The 2012 Madrid Masters (also known as the Mutua Madrid Open for sponsorship reasons) was played on outdoor blue clay courts at the Park Manzanares in Madrid, Spain from 7 to 13 May. It was the 11th edition of the event on the ATP and 4th on the WTA. It was classified as an ATP World Tour Masters 1000 event on the 2012 ATP World Tour and a Premier Mandatory event on the 2012 WTA Tour. The clay courts used for the tournament were dyed blue to provide better contrast with the ball, which garnered controversy amongst players who found the dyeing made the surface too slippery and difficult to maneuver, putting defensive players at a disadvantage. Ion Țiriac, the former Romanian ATP player and billionaire businessman who owns the tournament, instituted the use of the color.

Points and prize money

Point distribution

Prize money

ATP singles main-draw entrants

Seeds

 Rankings are as of April 30, 2012

Other entrants
The following players received wildcards into the main draw:
  Guillermo García López
  Ryan Harrison
  Javier Martí
  Albert Montañés

The following players received entry from the qualifying draw:
  Igor Andreev
  Federico Delbonis
  Alejandro Falla
  Daniel Gimeno Traver
  Santiago Giraldo
  Victor Hănescu
  Sergiy Stakhovsky

Withdrawals
  Mardy Fish
  Juan Mónaco (ankle injury)
  Andy Murray (back injury)
  Kei Nishikori (stomach injury)
  Andy Roddick (hamstring injury)
  Robin Söderling (mononucleosis)
  Julien Benneteau (elbow, ankle and wrist injuries)
  Łukasz Kubot

ATP doubles main-draw entrants

Seeds

 Rankings are as of April 30, 2012

Other entrants
The following pairs received wildcards into the doubles main draw:
  Sergei Bubka /  Javier Martí
  Daniel Gimeno Traver /  Iván Navarro

The following pair received entry as alternates:
  Alex Bogomolov Jr. /  Fabio Fognini

Withdrawals
  Philipp Kohlschreiber (adductor injury)

WTA singles main-draw entrants

Seeds

 Rankings are as of April 30, 2012

Other entrants
The following players received wildcards into the main draw:
  Lara Arruabarrena Vecino
  Garbiñe Muguruza Blanco
  Sílvia Soler Espinosa 
  Carla Suárez Navarro
  Venus Williams

The following players received entry from the qualifying draw:
  Jill Craybas
  Lourdes Domínguez Lino
  Andrea Hlaváčková
  Lucie Hradecká
  Mathilde Johansson
  Johanna Larsson
  Varvara Lepchenko
  Anastasia Rodionova

Withdrawals
  Daniela Hantuchová 
  Sabine Lisicki (ankle injury)
  Flavia Pennetta (wrist injury)
  Andrea Petkovic (ankle injury)

WTA doubles main-draw entrants

Seeds

 Rankings are as of April 30, 2012

Other entrants
The following pairs received wildcards into the doubles main draw:
  Dominika Cibulková /  Janette Husárová
  Lourdes Domínguez Lino /  Laura Pous Tió
  Anastasia Pavlyuchenkova /  Lucie Šafářová
  Sílvia Soler Espinosa /  Carla Suárez Navarro

Finals

Men's singles

 Roger Federer defeated  Tomáš Berdych, 3–6, 7–5, 7–5
It was Federer's fourth singles title of the year (out of four finals), and the 74th of his career. The win, Federer's third in Madrid after 2006 and 2009, was his second ATP World Tour Masters 1000 title of the year, and his 20th overall – at the time tying the record of Masters titles co-held by Rafael Nadal.

Women's singles

 Serena Williams defeated  Victoria Azarenka, 6–1, 6–3
It was Williams' second singles title of the year, and the 41st of her career – which tied her with Kim Clijsters as second among active players (10th in the Open Era) with the most singles titles. It was Williams' first Premier Mandatory title of the year, and her 12th Premier Mandatory/Premier 5 or Tier I title overall.

Men's doubles

 Mariusz Fyrstenberg /  Marcin Matkowski defeated  Robert Lindstedt /  Horia Tecău, 6–3, 6–4

Women's doubles

 Sara Errani /  Roberta Vinci defeated  Ekaterina Makarova /  Elena Vesnina, 6–1, 3–6, [10–4]

References

External links
 Official website

 

cs:Mutua Madrileña Madrid Open 2012 - muži
de:Mutua Madrid Open 2012/Herren